Thomas Steyning (died c. 1582?), of Earl Soham, Suffolk, was an English politician. He was a Member (MP) of the Parliament of England for Castle Rising in 1559.

Family
He married Frances Howard, Countess of Surrey and had two children: a son Henry, and a daughter, Mary. Mary married Charles Seckford.

References

Year of birth unknown
Year of death uncertain 
English MPs 1559
People from Suffolk Coastal (district)